HCF may refer to:

Arts and entertainment 
 Halt and Catch Fire (TV series)
 Hot Club de France, a French jazz group
 Half Circle Forward, a common move in fighting game special moves, popularized by Street Fighter II

Buildings in the United States 
 Honolulu Control Facility, an air traffic control complex
 Hutchinson Correctional Facility, Kansas
 Hawaii Correctional Facility

Businesses 
 Hard Candy Fitness, an American fitness center chain
 HCF Health Insurance, an Australian insurer

Non-profit organizations 
 Hispanic College Fund
 Historic Charleston Foundation, in South Carolina, United States
 Hamilton Community Foundation, in Ontario, Canada

Sports teams and bodies 
 Hellenic Cricket Federation
 Hellenic Cycling Federation
 Hércules CF, a Spanish football team
 Hungarian Chess Federation

Science, technology and mathematics 
 Halt and Catch Fire (computing), a semi-mythical machine code mnemonic
 High-cycle fatigue
 Highest common factor
 Host cell factor C1
 Hundred cubic feet, a unit of volume
 Hybrid coordination function